Bridge Street Historic District can refer to:
 Bridge Street Historic District (Westport, Connecticut), listed on the NRHP in Connecticut
 Bridge Street Historic District (Las Vegas, New Mexico), listed on the National Register of Historic Places (NRHP) in New Mexico
 Bridge Street Historic District (Montgomery, New York), listed on the NRHP in New York
 Bridge Street Commercial Historic District, Chippewa Falls, Wisconsin, listed on the NRHP in Wisconsin